Norman Frank Wilson (September 5, 1876 – July 14, 1956) was an Ontario farmer and political figure.

Early life; and political office

Wilson was born in Cumberland Township, Ontario (now Ottawa, [[Ontario) in 1876, the son of William Wilson and Mary McElroy. He studied at Upper Canada College and the Ontario Agricultural College at Guelph. Wilson operated a farm near Cumberland.

Wilson represented Russell in the House of Commons of Canada from 1904 to 1908 as a Liberal member.

Personal

In 1909, Wilson married Cairine Reay Mackay, who later became the first woman to sit in the Canadian Senate.

He died in 1956 in Ottawa.

References 
Canadian Parliamentary Guide, 1905, AJ Magurn

External links 
 

1876 births
1956 deaths
Liberal Party of Canada MPs
Members of the House of Commons of Canada from Ontario
Politicians from Ottawa
Upper Canada College alumni